Vladimir Dmitriyevich Ilyin (born 20 May 1992) is a Russian football centre forward who plays for FC Akhmat Grozny.

Club career
He made his debut in the Russian Second Division for FC Piter St. Petersburg on 23 July 2012 in a game against FC Dnepr Smolensk.

On 7 January 2020, he signed a 3.5-year contract with FC Akhmat Grozny.

On 11 June 2021, he moved to FC Krasnodar on a 3-year contract. On 22 June 2022, his contract with Krasnodar was terminated by mutual consent. On the next day Ilyin returned to FC Akhmat Grozny on a two-year contract.

Career statistics

Club

References

External links
 
 
 

1992 births
Footballers from Saint Petersburg
Living people
Russian footballers
Association football forwards
FC Dynamo Saint Petersburg players
FC Tosno players
FC Khimik Dzerzhinsk players
FC Kuban Krasnodar players
FC Ural Yekaterinburg players
FC Akhmat Grozny players
FC Krasnodar players
Russian Premier League players
Russian First League players
Russian Second League players